Krupa may refer to:

People 
 Krupa (surname)

Places

Bosnia and Herzegovina
 Bosanska Krupa, a town and municipality in the Federation of Bosnia and Herzegovina
 Krupa, Gornji Vakuf-Uskoplje, a village in the Federation of Bosnia and Herzegovina
 Krupa na Uni, a municipality in Republika Srpska
 Krupa na Vrbasu, a village near Banja Luka in Republika Srpska
 Krupa (Neretva), a river

Czech Republic
 Krupá (Morava), a creek in the Moravia region

Slovenia
 Krupa (Lahinja), a river
 Krupa, Semič, a village in the Municipality of Semič

Slovakia
 Krupá (Blava), a river in Slovakia

Croatia
 Krupa, Croatia, a village near Obrovac

Others 
 Krupa monastery in Croatia
 "Krupa" (song), a song by the band Apollo 440, named after Gene Krupa
 Alternative spelling for Kripa